Ajay Sastry is a movie director and writer who directed his maiden film called 'Nenu Meeku Telusa' starring Manchu Manoj, Sneha Ullal and Riya Sen.

His journey started with a short film called "12" (Baarah) that was produced by KAD Movies And Rana Daggubati (of dum marro dum Fame). In the past, he played the role of associate director and screenplay writer for movies such as Rakhi and Danger.

He had served as president of the Young Orators Club for many years. He had been a participant and winner at youth festivals in and around Hyderabad.

Ajay has also been the lead singer of rock bands like "Alter Egoz" and "Jekyll and Hyde". An orator and a poet, his poems have been published in the "American Anthology Of Poetry".

During his schooling, he had an opportunity through the YMCA to attend the 'World Championship Of Modern Western Dances' in London and ran a dance school for almost five years before he shifted to being an ad film-maker.

His first movie as a director 'Nenu Meeku Telusa' was released October 10, 2008.

Writer, director 
 Baarah (2004)
 Nenu Meeku Telusa (2008)
Ajay Sastry 's first commercial directorial venture is Nenu Meeku Telusa.

Associate director, writer 
 Rakhi (2006)
 Danger (2005)

Newspaper articles 
Rocking Affair

References

External links

Telugu people
Indian male screenwriters
1975 births
Living people